Diamonds in the Dirt is the second album by British blues artist Joanne Shaw Taylor. It was released in 2010 on Ruf Records.

Track listing
All songs by Joanne Shaw Taylor.

"Can't Keep Living Like This" – 5:12
"Dead and Gone" – 4:07
"Same as It Never Was" – 4:54
"Jump That Train" – 4:50
"Who Do You Love?" – 3:07
"Diamonds in the Dirt" – 5:07
"Let It Burn" – 4:30
"World on Fire" – 3:52
"Lord Have Mercy" – 4:40
"The World and  Way" – 4:57

Personnel
Joanne Shaw Taylor – guitars and vocals
David Smith – bass guitar
Steve Potts – drums
Rick Steff – keyboards

References

2010 albums
Joanne Shaw Taylor albums